Villemoustaussou (Languedocien: Vilamostausson) is a commune in the Aude department in southern France.

Population
The inhabitants of the commune are known as Villemachois in French.

See also
Communes of the Aude department
 List of works by James Pradier

References

Communes of Aude
Aude communes articles needing translation from French Wikipedia